Ipodrom is a station on the Kyiv Metro's Obolonsko–Teremkivska Line that opened on 25 October 2012. It is located towards the southern end of the line, located just after the Vystavkovyi Tsentr station, opened a year earlier in late 2011, and before the Teremky station which opened on 6 November 2013.

Ipodrom is named after Kyiv's horse racetrack and equestrian park which is located a short distance from the station.

References 

Kyiv Metro stations
Railway stations opened in 2012
2012 establishments in Ukraine